Ugly Alert is a 2013 South Korean daily drama starring Im Joo-hwan, Kang So-ra, Choi Tae-joon, and Kang Byul. It aired on SBS from May 20 to November 29, 2013 on Mondays to Fridays at 19:20 for 133 episodes.

Plot
Gong Joon-soo is a man who's had a rough life and early on had to fend for himself. He takes the blame for a murder his younger sibling commits and serves time in prison. There he learns to sew and acquires a trade. With his newly acquired skills, Joon-soo goes to work for Na Do-hee at a fashion company. Do-hee has inherited her job because her grandfather built the company. But even though she inherited her position, she is serious about doing a good job and is something of a workaholic.

Cast
Gong family
Im Joo-hwan as Gong Joon-soo
Kang Yi-seok as young Joon-soo 
Kang Byul as Gong Jin-joo
Jung Da-bin as young Jin-joo 
Choi Tae-joon as Gong Hyeon-seok
Nam Da-reum as young Hyeon-seok
Kim Seol-hyun as Gong Na-ri
Kim Ha-yoo as young Na-ri
Ahn Nae-sang as Gong Sang-man
Shin Ae-ra as Jin Sun-hye

Na family
Kang So-ra as Na Do-hee 
Shin So-yul as Shin Joo-young
Lee Soon-jae as Na Sang-jin
Chun Ho-jin as Na Il-pyung
Yoon Son-ha as Yoo Jung-hee
Lee Il-hwa as Na In-sook
Kim Il-woo as Shin Tae-il

Extended cast
Kim Young-hoon as Lee Han-seo
Hyun Woo as Kang Chul-soo
Song Ok-sook as Bang Jung-ja
Kim Ha-kyun as Choo Man-dol
Kim Dae-hee as Cha Dae-ki
Maya as Kim In-joo
Kim Da-rae as Miss Choi
Jo Hyun-jin as Miss Lee
Cho Yoon-woo as Lee Dong-woo
Ahn Sang-tae as Webtoon writer Park Moo-peul
Kim In-ho as Student part-timer 
Jang Ga-hyun as Team leader
Ban Hyo-jung as Chairwoman Ban Hyo-jung
Park Jae-rom
Moon Chun-shik
Ryu Sung-hoon

Cameos
Oh Seung-yoon as Lee Kyung-tae
Ahn Suk-hwan as Kyung-tae's father
Kim Seung-wook as Detective Kim
Nam Kyung-eup as Han-seo's father
Wang Bit-na as Joon-soo and Jin-joo's homeroom teacher (ep 1)
Maeng Bong-hak as Yoo Jung-yeon's father (ep 6)
Lee Hee-kyung as 25 Entertainment employee (ep 7)
Kim Min-kyung as Client

Ratings
In the tables below, the   represent the lowest ratings and the  represent the highest ratings.

Awards and nominations

References

External links
Ugly Alert official SBS website 

Seoul Broadcasting System television dramas
2013 South Korean television series debuts
2013 South Korean television series endings
Korean-language television shows
South Korean romance television series
South Korean melodrama television series